Pao An Tui sometimes incorrectly spelled Po An Tui or Poh An Tui, was a self-defense force of the Chinese-Indonesian community during the Indonesian Revolution (1945–1949). The group has often been accused of pro-Dutch sympathies in the struggle for Indonesian independence from Dutch colonial rule.

History
Following the end of the Second World War in Asia in 1945, separate units of Pao An Tui were formed by groups of Chinese-Indonesians, whom many Indonesian revolutionaries accused of siding with the Dutch. Units were created in Medan, North Sumatra in 1946, then in Java in 1947.

In order to address the disorder and violence against and by Chinese-Indonesians, the important community organization "Chung Hua Tsung Hui" hosted a conference in Batavia, the capital of colonial Indonesia, from August 24 until August 26, 1947. The conference resulted, on August 29, in the official formation of Pao An Tui, headquartered in Batavia. The Central Committee consisted of Loa Sek Hie (Chairman), Oey Kim Sen (Deputy Chairman), Khouw Joe Tjan (Secretary) and Cong Fai-kim (Treasurer), and claimed jurisdiction over all Pao An Tui units.

The force claimed neutrality during the revolution, receiving support for its establishment from both Sutan Sjahrir, first Prime Minister of revolutionary Indonesia, and arms from the pro-Dutch Allied forces. Pao An Tui was disbanded in 1949 with the cessation of violence and the conclusion of the revolution in Indonesian Independence.

Controversy and criticism
The neutrality of Pao An Tui in the struggle for Indonesia's independence has been challenged on a number of occasions. The Indonesian revolutionary government, suspecting the force of pro-Dutch sympathies, refused to extend its formal recognition until 1948. A minority of left-wing Chinese-Indonesians at the time also strongly resisted the force due to its close ties to the right-wing Chinese-Indonesian colonial elite and the Kuomintang in China.

In early 2016, a media furore was caused by the supposed unveiling of a monument to Pao An Tui at Taman Mini Indonesia Indah by the interior minister Tjahjo Kumolo. Rizieq Shihab, the Islamist leader of the Islamic Defenders Front, was one of the fiercest critics of the Indonesian government's apparent support for Pao An Tui. In fact, the monument in question was dedicated to an earlier Chinese militia, formed in the aftermath of the Chinese Massacre of 1740 in Batavia, that fought with the Javanese against the Dutch East India Company.

Various conspiracy theories continue to be associated with the putative specter of the Pao An Tui. For instance, in an opinion piece of May 2017, the writer and political commentator Batara Hutagalung accuses descendants of the Pao An Tui of conspiring with the Dutch government, supporters of Indonesian federalism and the defunct Indonesian Communist Party of destabilizing Indonesia by attempting to establish control over its resources, consumer market, as well as its geo-political and geo-strategic position as a form of 'historic revenge'.

References

Indonesian National Revolution
Chinese diaspora in Indonesia
Anti-Chinese sentiment in Indonesia
Military units and formations established in 1945
Military units and formations disestablished in 1949
Dutch East Indies
Aftermath of World War II in Indonesia
1945 establishments in Indonesia
1949 disestablishments in Indonesia